The Dyckman House, now the Dyckman Farmhouse Museum, is the oldest remaining farmhouse on Manhattan island, a vestige of New York City's rural past. It is now located in a small park at the corner of Broadway and 204th Street in Inwood, Manhattan.

History and description
Dyckman was the grandson of Jan Dyckman, who came to the area from Westphalia in 1661. William Dyckman, who inherited the family estate, built the current house to replace the family house located on the Harlem River near the present West 210th Street, which he had built in 1748, and which was destroyed in the American Revolutionary War.

The current two-story house is constructed of fieldstone, brick and white clapboard, and features a gambrel roof and spring eaves.  The porches are typical of the Dutch Colonial style, but were added in 1825.  The house's interior has parlors and an indoor winter kitchen in the basement, thus serving as a heating for the first floor. The rooms have floors of varying-width chestnut wood.  The house's outdoor smokehouse-summer kitchen, in a small building to the south, may predate the house itself. The back of the house holds a short hedges that resemble a maze.

The house stayed in the family for several generations until they sold it in 1868, after which it served as a rental property for several decades. By the beginning of the 20th century, the house was in disrepair and in danger of being demolished, and in 1915, the Dyckman family bought it back.

In 1915–16, two sisters of the Dyckman family, Mary Alice Dyckman Dean (Mrs Bashford Dean) and Fannie Fredericka Dyckman Welch, began a restoration of the farmhouse under the supervision of architect Alexander M. Welch, Fannie's husband.  In 1916, they transferred ownership of the house to the City of New York, which opened it as a museum of Dutch and Colonial life, featuring the original Dyckman family furnishings.

The farmhouse – which is not only the oldest remaining in Manhattan, but the only one in the Dutch Colonial style, and the only 18th-century farmhouse in the borough as well – has been a New York City Landmark and a National Historic Landmark since 1967.

In 2003, the house underwent a major restoration, after which it re-opened to the public in the fall of 2005.

In popular culture
 The Dyckman House was featured in Bob Vila's A&E Network production Guide to Historic Homes of America.

Gallery

See also
 List of New York City Designated Landmarks in Manhattan above 110th Street
 National Register of Historic Places listings in Manhattan above 110th Street
 List of National Historic Landmarks in New York City

References
Notes

External links 

Dyckman Farmhouse Museum website
"Dyckman Farmhouse" on the New York City Department of Parks and Recreation website

1784 establishments in New York (state)
Broadway (Manhattan)
Historic American Buildings Survey in New York City
Historic house museums in New York City
Houses completed in 1784
Houses on the National Register of Historic Places in Manhattan
Inwood, Manhattan
Museums in Manhattan
National Historic Landmarks in Manhattan
New York City Designated Landmarks in Manhattan
U.S. Route 9